Wipers was a punk rock band formed in Portland, Oregon, in 1977 by guitarist and vocalist Greg Sage, along with drummer Sam Henry and bassist Dave Koupal. The group's tight song structure and use of heavy distortion were hailed as extremely influential by numerous critics and musicians. They are also considered to be the first Pacific Northwest punk band.

History

Origins
Sage's intense interest in music began with cutting records at home as an adolescent.

Inspired by Jimi Hendrix, Sage soon picked up the guitar, and in 1969, at age 17, he played on an eponymous album by professional wrestler Beauregarde.

Foundation, early years
Sage founded Wipers in Portland in 1977 along with drummer Henry and bassist Koupal, originally just as a recording project. The plan was to record 15 albums in 10 years without touring or promotion. Sage thought that the mystique built from the lack of playing traditional rock 'n' roll would make people listen to their recordings much deeper with only their imagination to go by. He thought it would be easy to avoid press, shows, pictures and interviews. He looked at music as art rather than entertainment; he thought music was personal to the listener rather than a commodity.

Wipers' first single, "Better Off Dead", was released in 1978 on Sage's own Trap Records.

Sage wanted to make his own recordings and manufacture and run his own label without outside financing. In 1979, Sage approached several Portland punk bands (including Neo Boys, Sado-Nation and Stiphnoyds) and asked them to record singles for his new Trap label.

The Wipers first album, Is This Real?, was issued in January 1980 on Park Avenue Records, a label that the band hoped would gain them wider distribution. It was originally recorded on a 4-track in the band's rehearsal studio, but the label insisted that the band use a professional studio. Once released, the album gained a cult following, although the band was best known for their live shows around the Portland area.

Henry left to join the Rats, and Koupal moved to Ohio.

Later in 1980, Park Avenue released the Alien Boy EP, consisting of the title track and three demo outtakes.

With the new rhythm section of bassist Brad Davidson and drummer Brad Naish (ex-Stiphnoyds), Wipers recorded a second album for Park Avenue, the last for that label. Youth of America, released in 1981, contrasted with the short/fast punk songs of the time. According to Sage, this change of pace was a reaction against the punk trend of releasing short songs. The album was, according to Sage, not well received in the United States at the time of its release, though it did fare better in Europe. Along with other Wipers records, Youth of America came to be acknowledged as an important album in the development of American underground and independent rock movements of the early 80s.

The next album, Over the Edge, issued in 1983 by Trap via Brain Eater Records, was the first Wipers record to gain significant modern rock airplay. It was led by the song, "Romeo", which had already been released the previous year as a 7" single by Trap. The band then embarked on their first extensive tour, documented on the Wipers Tour 84 cassette-only live album, which was reissued by Enigma Records in 1985 as Wipers.

In 1985, Naish was replaced by Steve Plouf, and Enigma issued Sage's first solo album, Straight Ahead.

Signing to Enigma's Restless Records division, Wipers released 1986's Land of the Lost, featuring the song "Let Me Know", used in the film River's Edge. It was followed by Follow Blind (1987) and The Circle (1988).

In 1989, drummer Travis McNabb joined Wipers for a tour, during which Sage announced that the band was ending due to music business frustrations and the loss of their studio space. Sage then relocated to Phoenix, Arizona, and Davidson left to move to London. After building a new recording studio in Arizona, Sage released a second solo album, 1991's Sacrifice (For Love).

Two compilations were released in this era: The Best of Wipers and Greg Sage in 1990 by Restless, and Complete Rarities '78–'90 in 1993 by Germany's True Believer Records. The latter included the first Wipers 7", the B-side of the "Romeo" 7", sampler contributions, and live material from 1986 and 1989.

Sage restarted Wipers in 1993, rejoined by Plouf, releasing three additional albums as a duo: Silver Sail (1993) and The Herd (1996), both on the Tim/Kerr label, and Power in One (1999) on Sage's new Zeno Records. The band became inactive after 1999.

In 2001, Zeno released Wipers Box Set, which included the first three Wipers albums, which by that time had been long out-of-print, along with the songs from the Alien Boy EP and additional previously unreleased material. Jackpot Records and Sage later reissued Is This Real?, Youth of America and Over the Edge on vinyl.

Post-Wipers
Henry formed Napalm Beach with Chris Newman in 1982. He remained an active musician in Portland, Oregon, and continued to play with Napalm Beach and Don't, as well as popular Pacific Northwest songwriters such as Pete Krebs, Morgan Grace and Jimmy Boyer. Henry died from complications of stomach cancer on February 20, 2022, at the age of 65.

Plouf operated a vintage goods/Zeno Records store in Portland, appropriately named Zeno Oddities, which closed sometime between 2009 and 2010.

McNabb formed the Beggars, and went on to work as a session and tour drummer for artists including Vigilantes of Love, Billy Pilgrim, Shawn Mullins, Indigo Girls, Brendan Benson, Howie Day, Dar Williams, Mandi Perkins, Big & Rich and Gavin DeGraw. McNabb was a member of Better Than Ezra from 1996 to 2009. In 2007, he joined bluegrass/country music act Sugarland.

Davidson (who had previously recorded with the Sage-produced Rancid Vat in 1985) played bass on The Jesus and Mary Chain's 1993 EP Sound of Speed.

Influence and legacy
Sage later remarked on their initial reception: "We weren't even really a punk band. See, we were even farther out in left field than the punk movement because we didn't even wish to be classified, and that was kind of a new territory. ... When we put out Is This Real? ... it definitely did not fit in; none of our records did. Then nine, ten years later people are saying: 'Yeah, it's the punk classic of the '80s'".

In 1992, tribute album Eight Songs for Greg Sage and the Wipers was released by Tim/Kerr as a box set of four colored 7" records, featuring Wipers songs performed by Nirvana, Hole, Napalm Beach, M99, Dharma Bums, Crackerbash, Poison Idea and the Whirlees. The expanded CD release, retitled Fourteen Songs for Greg Sage and the Wipers, also included covers by Hazel, Calamity Jane, Saliva Tree, Honey, Nation of Ulysses, and Thurston Moore and Keith Nealy.

The Wipers had an influence on Nirvana. Wipers gained significant exposure as a result of Nirvana's 1992 covers of two songs from Is This Real? ("D-7" on the EP Hormoaning, and "Return of the Rat" on the Eight Songs compilation), and Nirvana frontman Kurt Cobain's mention of Wipers as a major influence. As did Cobain's wife Courtney Love, whose band covered "Over the Edge" both on recording and frequently at live performances. The Wipers were influential for the grunge music scene in general, also being cited by the Melvins, Mudhoney and Dinosaur Jr.

Members

Final lineup
 Greg Sage – vocals, guitar (1977–1989, 1993–1999) bass (1993–1999, only in the studio)
 Steve Plouf – drums (1985–1988, 1993–1999)

Former members
 Sam Henry – drums (1977–1980) (died 2022)
 Dave Koupal – bass (1977–1981)
 Brad Naish – drums (1981–1985)
 Brad Davidson – bass (1981–1987)
 Travis McNabb – drums (1989, former touring member)

Timeline

Discography

Studio albums
 Is This Real? (1980, Park Avenue Records)
 Youth of America (1981, Park Avenue Records)
 Over the Edge (1983, Trap Records/Brain Eater Records)
 Land of the Lost (1986, Restless Records)
 Follow Blind (1987, Restless Records)
 The Circle (1988, Restless Records)
 Silver Sail (1993, Tim/Kerr)
 The Herd (1996, Tim/Kerr)
 Power in One (1999, Zeno Records)

Live albums
 Wipers Tour 84 (1984, Trap Records)
 Wipers (1985, Enigma Records)

EPs
 Alien Boy (1980, Park Avenue Records)

Singles
 "Better Off Dead" (1978, Trap Records)
 "Romeo" (1981, Trap Records)
 "Silver Sail" (1993, Tim/Kerr)
 "The Herd" (1996, Tim/Kerr)
 "Insane" (1996, Tim/Kerr)

Compilation albums
 The Best of Wipers and Greg Sage (1990, Restless Records)
 Complete Rarities '78–'90 (1993, True Believer Records) 
 Wipers Box Set (2001, Zeno Records)
 Out Takes (2010, Jackpot Records)

Compilation appearances
 "Same Old Thing" on 10-29-79 (1980, Trap Records)
 "My Vengance" and "The Story" on Trap Sampler (1981, Trap Records)
 "Nothin' to Prove" on Sub Pop 9 (1983, Sub Pop)
 "Let Me Know" on River's Edge (1987, Enigma Records)
 "Nothin' to Prove (Live)" on Sub Pop 100 (1986, Sub Pop)
 "Return of the Rat" on Hype! The Motion Picture Soundtrack (1996, Sub Pop)

References

External links
 Official website of Greg Sage
 Official website of Sam Henry
 Biography and Info about The Wipers at Trouser Press
 
 

Interviews
 Interview with Greg Sage at UK-based Ptolemaic Terrascope 
 Interview about recording at Tape Op 
 Another Interview with Greg Sage at inmusicwetrust.com

Musical groups from Portland, Oregon
Punk rock groups from Oregon
Musical groups established in 1977
1977 establishments in Oregon
1988 disestablishments in Oregon
Musical groups disestablished in 1988
Musical groups reestablished in 1993
Musical groups disestablished in 1999
Restless Records artists
Enigma Records artists